Dambudzo Marechera (4 June 1952 – 18 August 1987) was a Zimbabwean novelist, short story writer, playwright and poet. His short career produced a book of stories, two novels (one published posthumously), a book of plays, prose, and poetry, and a collection of poetry (also posthumous). His first book, a fiction collection entitled The House of Hunger (1978), won the Guardian Fiction Prize in 1979. Marechera was best known for his abrasive, heavily detailed and self-aware writing, which was considered a new frontier in African literature, and his unorthodox behaviour at the universities from which he was expelled despite excelling in his studies.

Early life
Marechera was born in Vengere Township, Rusape, Southern Rhodesia, to Isaac Marechera, a mortuary attendant, and Masvotwa Venenzia Marechera, a maid. He was the child of Shona parents from the eastern-central part of Rhodesia.

In his 1978 book, The House of Hunger, and in interviews, Marechera demonstrates remarkable imagination and skill in the blending of art and real life, using his constrained and traumatic ghetto upbringing to abstract about his father having been either run over by "a 20th-century train" or come home "with a knife sticking from his back" or having been "found in the hospital mortuary with his body riddled with bullets". 

In search of original accounts of Marechera's childhood and upbringing, the German researcher Flora Veit-Wild gave considerable weight to an account given by Marechera's older brother, Michael, about what was said to be a destructive element in the younger Marechera's life. When Marechera returned from London and was made Writer-in-Residency at the University of Zimbabwe, his mother and sisters reportedly attempted to come and meet him but he rejected them offhand, accusing the mother of trying to kill him. Indeed, it is known from anecdotal accounts that Marechera never enjoyed strong relations with any member of his family after he came back to Rhodesia/Zimbabwe, up until the time he died in 1987.

He grew up amid racial discrimination, poverty, and violence. He attended St. Augustine's Mission, Penhalonga, where he clashed with his teachers over the colonial teaching syllabus, and he went on to the University of Rhodesia (now the University of Zimbabwe), from which he was expelled during student unrest, and New College, Oxford, where his unsociable behaviour and academic dereliction led to another expulsion.

Publishing success and subsequent years
At the University of Oxford, Marechera struck his professors as a very intelligent but rather anarchic student who had no particular interest in adhering to course syllabi, choosing rather to read whatever struck his fancy. He also had a reputation for being a quarrelsome young man who did not hesitate to fight his antagonists physically, especially in the pubs around Oxford. He began to display erratic behaviour, which may have been a result of excessive drinking or culture shock but which the school psychologist diagnosed as schizophrenia. Marechera threatened to murder certain people and attempted to set the university on fire. He was also famous — or notorious — for having no respect for authority derived from notions of racial or class superiority. For trying to set the college on fire, Marechera was given two options: either to submit to a psychiatric examination or be sent down; he chose the latter, charging that they were mentally raping him.

At this point, Marechera's life became troubled, even landing him in Cardiff Prison in 1977 for possession of marijuana, and a decision regarding his deportation. He joined the rootless communities around Oxford and other places, sleeping in friends' sitting-rooms and writing various fictional and poetic pieces on park benches and being regularly mugged by thugs and terrorized by the police for vagrancy. During this period, he also lived for many months in the squatting community at Tolmers Square in central London, and it is believed that this is where he finished writing his first book. It was thus from the combined experiences at the University of Rhodesia, Oxford and vagrancy on the streets of England and Wales that Marechera's most celebrated work, The House of Hunger, emerged.

Publication 
Marechera's first book and magnum opus, The House of Hunger (1978) – a collection of one novella and nine satellite short stories – came immediately after his largely disappointing time at New College, Oxford University. The House of Hunger was taken on by James Currey at Heinemann and published in their African Writers Series. The book's long title story describes the narrator's troubled childhood and youth in colonial Rhodesia in a style that is emotionally compelling and verbally pyrotechnic. The narrative is characterized by shifts in time and place and a blurring of fantasy and reality.

Regarded as signalling a new trend of incisive and visionary African writing, The House of Hunger was awarded the 1979 Guardian Fiction Prize. Marechera was the first and the only African to have won the award in its 33 years (it was replaced in 1999 by the Guardian First Book Award). Marechera became something of an instant celebrity in the literary circles of England. However, his self-destruct button proved irresistible and he constantly caused outrage. At the buffet dinner for the award of the Guardian Fiction Prize, in a tantrum Marechera memorably began to launch plates at a chandelier. Nevertheless, Leeds University and the University of Sheffield offered him positions as a writer-in-residence.

It seems that Marechera thought the British publishing establishment was ripping him off, so he resorted to raiding the Heinemann offices at odd times to ask for his royalties. Still, he lived in dire poverty and his physical health suffered greatly because he did not eat enough and drank too much. Friends, fellow Zimbabwean students such as Musaemura Zimunya (a poet in his own right), Rino Zhuwarara, Stanley Nyamfukudza (another gifted writer) and mere casual friends were all suspected by Marechera of being involved in his many troubles even when they acted in good faith. In the end he hung around with the down-and-outs who lived on the fringes of the literary establishment, barging into parties and generally getting into trouble and more than once, being bailed out by Currey. To complicate matters, many Africans, including fellow Zimbabwean students, did not feel Marechera was helping his cause by putting on airs, affecting an upper-class English accent and having an eccentric sense of dress. For his disruptive behaviour, he was regularly thrown out of the Africa Centre, the cultural meeting-place in London's Covent Garden for African and Afrocentric scholars and students. Some accounts suggest that Marechera married a British woman but not much is known about the union.

Marechera's 1980 experimental novel Black Sunlight has been compared with the writing of James Joyce and Henry Miller but it did not achieve the critical success of  The House of Hunger. Loosely structured and stylistically hallucinatory, with erudite digressions on various literary and philosophical points of discussion, Marechera's second book explores the idea of anarchism as a formal intellectual position.

Return to Zimbabwe and final years
Marechera returned to the newly independent Zimbabwe in 1982 to assist in shooting the film of The House of Hunger. However, he fell out with the director and remained behind in Zimbabwe when the crew left, leading a homeless existence in Harare before his death there five years later in 1987, from an AIDS-related pulmonary disorder, aged 35.

Mindblast; or, The Definitive Buddy (1984) was written the year after his return home and comprises three plays, a prose narrative, a collection of poems, and a park-bench diary. The book criticizes the materialism, intolerance, opportunism, and corruption of post-independence Zimbabwe, extending the political debate beyond the question of nationalism to embrace genuine social regeneration. The combination of intense self-scrutiny, cogent social criticism, and open, experimental form appealed to a young generation of Zimbabweans, the so-called mindblast generation, who were seeking new ways of perceiving their roles within the emergent nation.

The Black Insider, posthumously published in 1990, is set in a faculty of arts building that offers refuge for a group of intellectuals and artists from an unspecified war outside, which subsequently engulfs them as well. The conversation of the characters centres on African identity and the nature of art, with the protagonist arguing that the African image is merely another chauvinistic figure of authority.

Marechera's poetry was published posthumously under the title Cemetery of Mind (1992). Like his stories, his poems show the influence of modernist writers from Arthur Rimbaud and T. S. Eliot to Allen Ginsberg and Christopher Okigbo, and confirm his proclivity for perceptive social critique, intense self-exploration, and verbal daring.

In an interview, Marechera said of himself: "I think I am the doppelganger whom, until I appeared, African literature had not yet met. This is an accurate assessment of Marechera's role in shocking the reader into looking at himself anew through the eyes of the other. His individualism, literary experimentation, and iconoclasm ensure that his work resists narrow definitions; it is constantly shifting and crossing boundaries.

Awards

 1979: Guardian Fiction Prize

Legacy

Marechera remains Zimbabwe's most important cultural product on the creative writing front. Since his death, dozens of younger writers and many of his colleagues have written numerous accounts and biographies detailing his troubled life and works. In the 1990s, the most prominent were foreigners, especially the German scholar Flora Veit-Wild, who has written both a biography and a sourcebook of Marechera's life and works. What Wild misses dismally is the fact that Marechera edited his own life as he went along. Wild seems to take many of the things she got from Marechera as facts. In an article in Wasafiri magazine in March 2012, Wild replied to the question about why she "did not write a proper Dambudzo Marechera biography" by saying: "My answer was that I did not want to collapse his multi-faceted personality into one authoritative narrative but rather let the diverse voices speak for themselves. But this is not the whole truth. I could not write his life story because my own life was so intricately entangled with his." She then described in detail her very personal involvement with him over an 18-month period.

Ainehi Edoro of Brittle Paper has stated that "today, Marechera is an icon for experimental fiction and cultural rebellion in African literature.""

Bibliography
 1978: The House of Hunger, Heinemann African Writers Series
 1980: Black Sunlight
 1984: Mindblast or The Definitive Buddy
 1992: The Black Insider
 1992: Cemetery of Mind
 1994: Scrapiron Blues

References

Further reading

 Hamilton, Grant (ed.), Reading Marechera, James Currey, 2013. .
 Julie Cairnie and Dobrota Pucherova (eds), Moving Spirit: The Legacy of Dambudzo Marechera in the 21st Century, LIT Verlag Münster, 2012. .
 Veit-Wild, Flora, "Dambudzo Marechera: A Preliminary Annotated Bibliography". Zambesia, 14:2, 121–29, 1987.
 Veit-Wild, Flora, Dambudzo Marechera: A Source Book on his Life and Work. London: Hans Zell, 1992. Harare, University of Zimbabwe Publications, 1993.
 Veit-Wild, Flora, They Called You Dambudzo, South Africa: Jacana Media Ltd, 2020, 
 Veit-Wild, Flora, and Anthony Chennells (eds), Emerging Perspectives on Dambudzo Marechera. Trenton, Africa World Press, 1999, .

External links
 Helon Habila, "On Dambudzo Marechera: The Life and Times of an African Writer", Virginia Quarterly Review, Winter 2006.
 Chris Power, "A brief survey of the short story, part 54: Dambudzo Marechera", The Guardian, 7 January 2014.
 Tafadzwa Tichawangana, "Dambudzo Marechera – His Life and Work (In His Own Words)", Moonwalking With My Muse, 4 June 2014.
 "Dambudzo Marechera", Beyond the Single Story, 1 April 2018.
 Percy Zvomuya, "Dambudzo Marechera: The biggest tree in the savannah", Mail & Guardian, 7 October 2021.

1952 births
1987 deaths
20th-century male writers
20th-century novelists
20th-century poets
20th-century short story writers
AIDS-related deaths in Zimbabwe
Alumni of New College, Oxford
Male novelists
Male poets
People from Rusape
20th-century squatters
University of Zimbabwe alumni
Zimbabwean male short story writers
Zimbabwean male writers
Zimbabwean novelists
Zimbabwean poets
Zimbabwean short story writers